Idaea minuta is a species of geometrid moth in the family Geometridae. It is found in North America.

The MONA or Hodges number for Idaea minuta is 7101.

References

Further reading

External links

 

Sterrhini
Articles created by Qbugbot
Moths described in 1901